Quesada is a genus of cicadas from South and North America.

List of species
 Quesada gigas (Olivier, 1790)
 Quesada sodalis (Walker, 1850)

References

Fidicinini
Hemiptera of North America
Cicadidae genera
Taxa named by William Lucas Distant